Rabia Butt (born Rabia Rashid, 26 February 1990), is a Pakistani supermodel,  and actress. She has been the face of many leading brands in Pakistan, including Khaadi, Élan and Sapphire. She has won two Lux Style Awards and a BCW award for her work in Pakistan's fashion industry. Later, she pursued a career in acting.

Career
She filmed her debut feature film titled Hijrat (2016), directed by Farooq Mengal, opposite Asad Zaman. The film was released in 2016.

She appeared in several music videos such as Saaiyaan by Qurat-ul-Ain Balouch and Nakhun by Sajjad Ali.

Her television debut was in the popular period drama Aangan (2018) on HUM TV, which was directed by Mohammed Ehteshamuddin, followed by Yeh Dil Mera (2019), directed by Aehsun Talish opposite Adnan Siddique alongside Sajjal Ali and Ahad Raza Mir. In 2020, she was featured in a leading role in another television project, Soteli Maamta (2020), directed by Meer Sikandar Ali. In 2021, she starred in 'Pehli Si Mohabbat' alongside Maya Ali and Sheharyaar Munawar.

Filmography

References

External links

Living people
1990 births
Actresses from Lahore
Pakistani female models
Pakistani television actresses
Pakistani film actresses
Punjabi people
Lux Style Award winners
People from Lahore